The North Eastern Railway Class E1, classified as Class J72 by the London and North Eastern Railway (LNER), is a class of small 0-6-0T steam locomotives designed by Wilson Worsdell for shunting.  They had inside cylinders and Stephenson valve gear.

They were a development of the earlier NER Class E (LNER Class J71) 0-6-0T designed by T.W. Worsdell who was Wilson Worsdell's brother.

History

Build dates

A total of 113 locomotives were built:

 1898–1899, 20 locos built by NER at Darlington Works
 1914, 20 locos built by NER at Darlington Works
 1920, 10 locos built by NER at Darlington Works
 1922, 25 locos built for NER by Armstrong Whitworth & Co
 1925, 10 locos built by LNER at Doncaster Works
 1949–1951, 28 locos built by British Railways at Darlington Works

This is a rare, possibly unique, example of a locomotive class which was built, completely unchanged, under pre-grouping, post-grouping and British Railways administration.

Numbering

British Railways numbers were:

 68670-68754 (pre-nationalisation locos)
 69001-69028 (new locos)

Preservation 
No. 69023 (Departmental No. 59) was purchased by Mr. R. Ainsworth. It is owned by the North Eastern Locomotive Preservation Group. It has worked on several preserved railways.  In contrast to the normal black paint finish, this loco operates in a hybrid NER/LNER/BR apple green paint scheme. It re-entered service in 2010 and visited many heritage railways. No. 69023 is now based on the Wensleydale Railway but returns to the  NELPG's base at Hopetown Carriage Works, Darlington for winter maintenance.

References

Further reading

External links 

 The W.Worsdell J72 (NER Class E1) 0-6-0 Tank Engines LNER Encyclopedia
 NELPG 50th Anniversary North Eastern Locomotive Preservation Group

E1
0-6-0T locomotives
Railway locomotives introduced in 1898
Armstrong Whitworth locomotives
Standard gauge steam locomotives of Great Britain
Shunting locomotives